The shiitake (alternate form shitake) (Lentinula edodes) is an edible mushroom native to East Asia, which is now cultivated and consumed around the globe. It is considered a medicinal mushroom in some forms of traditional medicine.

Taxonomy and naming
The fungus was first described scientifically as Agaricus edodes by Miles Joseph Berkeley in 1877. It was placed in the genus Lentinula by David Pegler in 1976. The fungus has acquired an extensive synonymy in its taxonomic history:
Agaricus edodes Berk. (1878)
Armillaria edodes (Berk.) Sacc. (1887)
Mastoleucomychelloes edodes (Berk.) Kuntze (1891)
Cortinellus edodes (Berk.) S.Ito & S.Imai (1938)
Lentinus edodes (Berk.) Singer (1941)
Collybia shiitake J.Schröt. (1886)
Lepiota shiitake (J.Schröt.) Nobuj. Tanaka (1889)
Cortinellus shiitake (J.Schröt.) Henn. (1899)
Tricholoma shiitake (J.Schröt.) Lloyd (1918)
Lentinus shiitake (J.Schröt.) Singer (1936)
Lentinus tonkinensis Pat. (1890)
Lentinus mellianus Lohwag (1918)

The specific epithet  is the Latin word for "edible".

It is also commonly called "sawtooth oak mushroom", "black forest mushroom", "black mushroom", "golden oak mushroom", or "oakwood mushroom".

Habitat and distribution
Shiitake grow in groups on the decaying wood of deciduous trees, particularly shii and other chinquapins, chestnut, oak, maple, beech, sweetgum, poplar, hornbeam, ironwood, and mulberry. Its natural distribution includes warm and moist climates in Southeast Asia.

Cultivation history
The earliest written record of shiitake cultivation is seen in the Records of Longquan County compiled by He Zhan in 1209 during the Song dynasty in China. The 185-word description of shiitake cultivation from that literature was later cross-referenced many times and eventually adapted in a book by a Japanese horticulturist  in 1796, the first book on shiitake cultivation in Japan.
The Japanese cultivated the mushroom by cutting shii trees with axes and placing the logs by trees that were already growing shiitake or contained shiitake spores. Before 1982, the Japan Islands' variety of these mushrooms could only be grown in traditional locations using ancient methods. A 1982 report on the budding and growth of the Japanese variety revealed opportunities for commercial cultivation in the United States.

Shiitake are now widely cultivated worldwide, contributing about 25% of the total yearly production of mushrooms. Commercially, shiitake mushrooms are typically grown in conditions similar to their natural environment on either artificial substrate or hardwood logs, such as oak.

Culinary

Nutrition

In a  reference serving, raw shiitake mushrooms provide  of food energy and are 90% water, 7% carbohydrates, 2% protein and less than 1% fat. Raw shiitake mushrooms contain moderate levels of some dietary minerals.

Like all mushrooms, shiitakes produce vitamin D2 upon exposure of their internal ergosterol to ultraviolet B (UVB) rays from sunlight or broadband UVB fluorescent tubes.

Uses

Fresh and dried shiitake have many uses in East Asian cuisine. In Japan, they are served in miso soup, used as the basis for a kind of vegetarian dashi, and as an ingredient in many steamed and simmered dishes. In Chinese cuisine, they are often sautéed in vegetarian dishes such as Buddha's delight.

Another high-grade mushroom is called  in Chinese, literally "flower mushroom", which has a flower-like cracking pattern on the mushroom's upper surface. Both of these are produced at lower temperatures.

Research

Dermatitis

Rarely, consumption of raw or slightly cooked shiitake mushrooms may cause an allergic reaction called "shiitake dermatitis", including an erythematous, micro-papular, streaky pruriginous rash that occurs all over the body including face and scalp, appearing about 24 hours after consumption, possibly worsening by sun exposure and disappearing after 3 to 21 days. This effect – presumably caused by the polysaccharide, lentinan – is more common in East Asia, but may be growing in occurrence in Europe as shiitake consumption increases. Thorough cooking may eliminate the allergenicity.

Gallery

References

Citations

External links 
 

Articles containing video clips
Chinese edible mushrooms
Edible fungi
Fungi in cultivation
Fungi of Asia
Japanese cuisine terms
Marasmiaceae
Medicinal fungi